In FOSS development communities, a forge is a web-based collaborative software platform for both developing and sharing computer applications. The term forge refers to a common prefix or suffix adopted by various platforms created after the example of SourceForge. This usage of the word stems from the metalworking forge, used for shaping metal parts.

For software developers it is an online service to host the tools they need to communicate with their coworkers. The source code itself is stored in a revision control system and linked to a wide range of services such as a bug database, continuous integration, etc. When a FOSS development community forks, it duplicates the content of the forge and is then able to modify it without asking permission. A community may rely on services scattered on multiple forges: they are not necessarily hosted under the same domain. For instance it is not uncommon for discussions to be hosted on Discourse while the source code is hosted on Gitea.

For users, a forge is a repository of computer applications, a place where bugs can be reported, a channel to be informed of security issues, etc. 

Software forges became popular in 2001, and have proven successful as a software development environment for millions of software projects.

Technology 
Two different kinds of concepts are commonly referred to by the term forge:
 a service offered on a Web platform to host software development projects;
 an integrated set of software elements which produce such platforms, ready for deployment.

All these platforms provide similar tools helpful to software developers working in the hosted projects:
 source code management systems
 mailing-lists or forums
 wikis
 download services
 bug tracking system

Some provide other features as well:
 code review

Interoperability

API and webhooks 

In addition to the web user interface, it is common for a forge to provide a REST API with the a documentation (GitHub, GitLab, Gitea, etc.) to enable interoperability with other products. Forge users can also install webhooks to notify a third party online service when an event happens on their software project (for instance the webhook can be called when a new issue is created).

Federation 

Federation and the associated protocol ActivityPub (introduced in 2018) allows forges to communicate with each other about their  activities (for instance when issues are created or a commit is pushed). Although native federation support is sometime discussed or in progress it is not yet available. Third party projects emerged to bridge the gap such as a plugin for the pagure forge or a proxy supporting ActivityPub and translating it to REST API calls to the designated forge.

Authentication 

There is no SSO that applications and users could rely on to authenticate with all forges. Instead it is common for a forge to support a number of authentication providers: if a user already has an account they can use it to authenticate on the forge and do not need to create a new account (for instance GitLab supports OAuth2 providers such as GitHub). Some forges can act as an authentication provider (for instance Gitea is an OAuth2 provider as well as GitLab).

Integration 

To improve the user and the system administrator experience when using multiple online services, some forges are integrated with popular third-party software and services such as online chat (for instance mattermost has a plugin for GitHub and is natively support by GitLab).

Examples

Free software
 Allura
 Forgejo
 FusionForge
 Gitea
 GitBucket (GitHub compatible)
 Joinup (Drupal-based)
 Kallithea
 Launchpad Suite
 Phabricator
 Redmine
 SourceHut
 Trac
 Tuleap

Freemium software
 GitLab
 GForge Advanced Server

Free online services
 Joinup collaboration platform
 Launchpad
 OSDN (Open Source Development Network)
 SourceForge
 GNU Savannah
 sourcehut (while in alpha)

Freemium online services
 GitLab
 GitHub
 Bitbucket

Discontinued software
 Savane (software)
 GForge Community Edition (last release April 23, 2010), not to be confused with the proprietary GForge first released October 1, 2018.

Discontinued online services
 BerliOS (It was disbanded in 2014, some projects have been moved to Joinup collaboration platform.)
 CodePlex (Shut down on December 15, 2017)
 Gitorious (deprecated, superseded by GitLab)
 Gna.org
 Google Code
 Open Source Assistive Technology Software (OATS)
 Project Kenai (created by Sun Microsystems but shut down by Oracle)
 Tigris.org (Shut down on July 1, 2020)

See also 
 Collaborative development environment (CDE)
 Project management software (PMS)
 Software project management
 Comparison of source-code-hosting facilities
 List of free software project directories
 Application lifecycle management (ALM)

References

Project hosting websites